In differential geometry, Kawasaki's Riemann–Roch formula, introduced by Tetsuro Kawasaki, is the Riemann–Roch formula for orbifolds. It can compute the Euler characteristic of an orbifold.

Kawasaki's original proof made a use of the equivariant index theorem. Today, the formula is known to follow from the Riemann–Roch formula for quotient stacks.

References 
Tetsuro Kawasaki. The Riemann-Roch theorem for complex V-manifolds. Osaka J. Math., 16(1):151–159, 1979

Theorems in differential geometry
Theorems in algebraic geometry

See also 
Riemann–Roch-type theorem